Nomads Sports Club is a former first-class cricket team in Sri Lanka. 

Nomads are one of the oldest Sri Lankan cricket teams. They won the P Sara Trophy in 1964-65 and 1967-68 in the days before the competition had first-class status. They competed in the first-class competition in 1988-89 and 1994-95. Of their 12 matches they won one, lost five and drew six. They played their home matches at Viharamahadevi Park, Colombo.

They continue to compete at sub-first-class levels.

Notable players
 
 Jayantha Amerasinghe
 Pradeep de Silva
 Somachandra de Silva
 Lionel Fernando
 Stanley Jayasinghe
 A. C. M. Lafir
 Anurudda Polonowita

See also
 List of Sri Lankan cricket teams

References

External links
 Nomads Sports Club at CricketArchive

Former senior cricket clubs of Sri Lanka